The Kensico Cemetery station was a commuter rail stop on the Metro-North Railroad's Harlem Line that served the nearby Kensico Cemetery, to the north of Lakeview Avenue. Located along the platform behind the buildings at Sharon Gardens, the station was similar to the still-existent and nearby Mount Pleasant station in which it served friends and family of those buried there instead of actual commuters.

By the late 1970s the low-level station saw only three trains a day on weekends, and was a flag stop for one train on weekdays. Upon the electrification of the Harlem Line between North White Plains and Brewster North in 1983, the station was closed given its redundancy to Mount Pleasant and the cost to modernize the station.

References

Metro-North Railroad stations in New York (state)
Former New York Central Railroad stations
Railway stations in Westchester County, New York

Railway stations closed in 1983
Railway stations in the United States opened in 1891
1891 establishments in New York (state)